The East Maine Conference Seminary was a Methodist seminary and preparatory school in Bucksport, Maine. Located on Wilson Street in Bucksport, it educated students from 1848 to 1933. A building built and used by EMCS, Wilson Hall, is on the National Register of Historic Places.

Notable alumni
 Edville Gerhardt Abbott, American orthopedic surgeon and orthotist (Class of 1889)
 Jeremiah E. Burke, Superintendent of schools in Boston and Lawrence, Massachusetts (class of 1886)
 Clarence M. Condon, United States Army Sergeant who received the Medal of Honor for actions during the Philippine–American War
 Frank Fellows, U.S. Representative from Maine serving from (1941-1951)
 DeForest H. Perkins, Public School Superintendent and Grand Dragon of the Maine Ku Klux Klan

References

Methodist seminaries and theological colleges
Schools in Hancock County, Maine
Bucksport, Maine
1848 establishments in Maine
1933 disestablishments in Maine
Educational institutions established in 1848
Educational institutions disestablished in 1933